Latvia participated in the Eurovision Choir of the Year 2017, where they were also the host country of the inaugural Eurovision Choir of the Year. On 29 April 2017, six acts competed in the national selection Latvija Dzied! (Latvia Sing!), organised by the Latvian national broadcaster, Latvijas Televīzija (LTV). Spīgo, under the conductorship of Līga Celma–Kursiete, was chosen as the first representatives at the inaugural contest on 22 July 2017.

Background

The 2017 edition was the inaugural Eurovision Choir of the Year, which Latvia made their debut appearance as well as hosting the contest at the Arena Riga, Riga, Latvia on 22 July 2017.

Before Eurovision
Latvijas Televīzija (LTV) announced on 29 March 2017, that they had opted for a national selected process in order to choose their representatives at the Eurovision Choir of the Year 2017. Latvija Dzied! (Latvia Sing!) took place on 29 April 2017, in which six acts competed for the chance to represent Latvia at the inaugural contest. Each of the six competing acts performed a six-minute piece reflecting the Latvian culture. Spīgo, under the conductorship of Līga Celma–Kursiete, was announced as the winner having received the most votes by the jury and public televoting.

Finalists

References

External links

Eurovision
2017